The Art of the Game is an hour-long documentary film that explores the cultural importance of video gaming by following a group of students at the Academy of Art University in San Francisco as they compete for a job in the video game industry.

Production 

The film was produced by Story Developing and directed by Matthew Davis Walker who co-Produced Muscle Shoals and produced by Ryan Lynch.
Music for the film was scored by Peder Gilham and Blake Atwell.

Synopsis 

The film features interview subjects such as Paola Antonelli of MoMA, Anthony Burch, Ashly Burch, Mattie Brice, and Randy Pitchford of Gearbox.

Release 

The film was available to view on Machinima's YouTube channel, as of 2015 the video is private and cannot be viewed on youtube. Prior to YouTube, the film was released May 8 on Machinima's Twitch Channel (Twitch/machinima) at 1 p.m. and 6 p.m. PDT. From May 9–11, the film could be seen on Xbox Live via Machinima's app on Xbox One and Xbox 360 dashboards.

Critical reception 

Forbes called the film an "evocative love letter to the video game industry."

References 

American documentary films
2014 documentary films
Documentary films about video games
2014 films
2010s English-language films
2010s American films